Tanguy  is a 2001 French black comedy by Étienne Chatiliez.

Plot 
When he was a newborn baby, Edith Guetz thoughtlessly told her son Tanguy : "If you want to, you can stay at home forever". 28 years later, the over-educated university teacher of Asian languages and womanizer leads a successful and wealthy life... while still living in his parents' home. Father Paul Guetz longs to see his son finally leave the nest, a desire that his wife shares. Edith finally agrees and the pair unite to make Tanguy's life at home miserable. However, they don't know that Tanguy isn't the type of guy who easily gives up.

Cast
 Sabine Azéma: Edith Guetz
 André Dussollier: Paul Guetz
 Éric Berger: Tanguy Guetz
 Hélène Duc: Grandmother Odile
 Aurore Clément: Carole
 Jean-Paul Rouve: Bruno Lemoine
 André Wilms: the psychiatrist
 Richard Guedj: Patrick
 Roger Van Hool: Philippe
 Nathalie Krebs: Noëlle
 Delphine Serina: Sophie
 Sachi Kawamata: Kimiko
 Annelise Hesme: Marguerite
 Philippe Laudenbach: Lawyer Badinier 
 Jacques Boudet: the judge

Reception
The film opened at number one in France with a gross of 29 million Francs ($4.2 million).  It went on to gross $21.4 million in France and $24.3 million worldwide.

In popular culture
The word Tanguy became the usual term to designate an adult still living with his parents.

References

External links 

2001 films
Films set in Paris
2000s French-language films
2001 comedy-drama films
2001 comedy films
2001 drama films
French comedy-drama films
Films directed by Étienne Chatiliez
2000s French films